Chinkiang pot cover noodle is one kind of incooked wheaten food, which is known to every household in China.

Legends
In ancient times, there was a family in Chinkiang. When the wife cooked noodles for her husband, the pot cover of the cooking stove would slip into the noodles pot. However, the  noodles were more delicious, neither hard nor lousy. Therefore, he opened a noodle store with a partner. People loved to call it "the pot cover noodles".

References

Chinese noodle dishes